Pinon is a census-designated place (CDP) in Navajo County, Arizona, United States, and located in the Navajo Nation. The population was 904 at the 2010 census.

Geography
Pinon is located at  (36.100862, -110.219387).

Demographics

As of the census of 2000, there were 1,190 people, 296 households, and 240 families living in the CDP. The racial makeup of the CDP was 91.9% Native American, 7.7% White, 0.3% from other races, and 0.1% from two or more races.  2.0% of the population were Hispanic or Latino of any race. Navajo people make up a majority of the population in Pinon, with other being Hopi and Caucasian people.

There were 296 households, out of which 58.1% had children under the age of 18 living with them, 53.4% were married couples living together, 25.0% had a female householder with no husband present, and 18.9% were non-families. 18.6% of all households were made up of individuals, and 2.0% had someone living alone who was 65 years of age or older.  The average household size was 4.02 and the average family size was 4.69.

In the CDP, the population was spread out, with 46.3% under the age of 18, 11.3% from 18 to 24, 27.0% from 25 to 44, 12.9% from 45 to 64, and 2.5% who were 65 years of age or older.  The median age was 20 years. For every 100 females, there were 98.0 males.  For every 100 females age 18 and over, there were 85.8 males.

The nucleus income for a household in the CDP was $19,271, and the median income for a family was $23,393. Males had a median income of $16,471 versus $27,000 for females. The per capita income for the CDP was $6,045.  About 52.1% of families and 53.7% of the population were below the poverty line, including 54.7% of those under age 18 and 100.0% of those age 65 or over.

Education 
Piñon Unified School District serves the area. Piñon Elementary School, Piñon Middle School, and Piñon High School serve the area.

The Bureau of Indian Education (BIE) operates the Jeehdeez'a Academy, Inc., in an area with a Piñon postal address.

See also

 List of census-designated places in Arizona

References

External links

Census-designated places in Navajo County, Arizona
Populated places on the Navajo Nation